Roger Grillo is a former American ice hockey player and coach who is currently a regional manager for USA Hockey. A 10th round pick of the Vancouver Canucks in 1983, Grillo played for Maine for three seasons before starting a coaching career. After stints with Norwich and Vermont as an assistant Grillo became the head coach at Brown in 1997. Over twelve seasons Grillo had a moderate amount of success, producing three winning seasons, before accepting an offer from USA Hockey to become Regional Manager, American Development Model, a job he currently occupies.

Head coaching record

References

External links

1964 births
American ice hockey coaches
American men's ice hockey defensemen
Vermont Catamounts men's ice hockey coaches
Brown Bears men's ice hockey coaches
Ice hockey coaches from Minnesota
Living people
Maine Black Bears men's ice hockey players
People from Apple Valley, Minnesota
Vancouver Canucks draft picks
Ice hockey players from Minnesota